The Merced Union High School District (MUHSD) is a school district headquartered in the Castle Commerce Center on the grounds of the Castle Airport Aviation and Development Center in unincorporated Merced County, California, near Atwater. The union high school district serves Atwater, Livingston, Merced, and the surrounding area.

Demographics

In November 1990 the district had 1,057 students of Southeast Asian origin, including 597 boys and 460 girls. At the time the high school enrollment among Hmong had a large gender imbalance because Hmong girls were pressured to marry relatively early in their lives.

Schools

Adult schools
 Merced Adult School (Merced)

High schools
 Atwater High School (Atwater)
 Buhach Colony High School (Atwater)
 El Capitan High School (Merced) - 
 Golden Valley High School (Merced)
 Independence High School (Merced)
 Livingston High School (Livingston)
 Merced High School (Merced)
 Sequoia High School (Merced)
 Yosemite High School (Merced)

Headquarters
The district has its headquarters within the Castle Commerce Center in unincorporated Merced County, California, near Atwater. The Castle Commerce Center is a  business park located on the grounds of the Castle Airport Aviation and Development Center (the former Castle Air Force Base). The development houses commercial and industrial development.

References

External links

 

School districts in Merced County, California
Merced, California